The Mizoram People's Conference was a regional political party in Mizoram, India. It was formed by Brig Thenphunga Sailo on 17 April 1975. Ṭhenphunga was the party chairman and Chief Minister of Mizoram from 1979 to 1984, and an army officer and then a human rights activist before starting his political party.

Following the MPC's defeat in 1984, it was the main opposition party for the next two decades. In the 1998 assembly elections, it won 12 seats. However, in the 2003 elections, the party won only three seats, a number which fell to two in the 2008 elections and one in 2013. It ultimately won four seats in the 2018 election and their MLA quit to join ZPM. MPC was the third largest party in Mizoram for three decades. It merged with the People's Representation for Identity and Status of Mizoram party as the People’s Conference Party.

List of chief ministers 

 T. Sailo
 First term: 2 June 1978 to 10 November 1978 
 Second term: 8 May 1979 to 4 May 1984

See also
 Mizo People's Conference (Progressive)
 Zoram People's Movement

References

Political parties in Mizoram
Political parties established in 1975
1975 establishments in Mizoram
Recognised state political parties in India